Peribatodes is a genus of moths in the family Geometridae. The genus was described by Wehrli in 1943.

In 1999, about 13 species were included in the genus.

Species include:
 Peribatodes ilicaria (Geyer, 1833) – Lydd beauty
 Peribatodes rhomboidaria (Denis & Schiffermüller, 1775) – willow beauty
 Peribatodes secundaria (Denis & Schiffermüller, 1775) – feathered beauty
 Peribatodes umbraria (Hübner, 1809) – olive-tree beauty

References

Boarmiini